IFAF Americas is the federation that governs the sport of American football in the Americas and qualifies teams from North America, Central America, the Caribbean and South America in the IFAF World Cup. It replaced the Pan American Federation of American Football (PAFAF) in 2012.

Members

See also
International Federation of American Football (IFAF)

References

External links
IFAF Americas on the IFAF Website

International Federation of American Football
 
Pan-American sports governing bodies
Sports organizations established in 2007